Aharon Jacobashvili (also Aaron and Jakobashvili; אהרון יעקבשווילי; born September 18, 1964) is an Israeli former Olympic boxer.

He was born in Georgia, and is Jewish.

Boxing career
He competed for Israel at the 1988 Summer Olympics in Seoul, South Korea, at the age of 23. He boxed in the Men's Middleweight competition, losing on points to West German Sven Ottke (who later was the IBF super-middleweight world champion from 1998 to 2004, and the WBA super-middleweight world champion from 2003 to 2004), and came in tied for 32nd.

References 

1964 births
Israeli Jews
Living people
Jewish boxers
Israeli male boxers
Olympic boxers of Israel
Jews from Georgia (country)
Soviet emigrants to Israel
Boxers at the 1988 Summer Olympics
People from Nof HaGalil
Middleweight boxers
Israeli people of Georgian-Jewish descent
20th-century Israeli people